Maksim Eduardovich Bokov (born 29 August 1973) is a Russian football coach and a former player.

Honours
 Russian Premier League runner-up: 1998.
 Russian Premier League bronze: 1999.
 Russian Cup winner: 2004.
 Russian Cup runner-up: 2000.
 Top 33 players year-end list: 1996, 1997, 1998.

International career
He played his first game for Russia on 7 February 1997 in a Carlsberg Cup game against Yugoslavia and played 2 more games for Russia that year.

Personal life
His son Danila Bokov is also a professional footballer, he plays in goalkeeper position.

References

External links 
  Profile

1973 births
Footballers from Saint Petersburg
Living people
Russian footballers
Association football defenders
Russian football managers
Russia youth international footballers
Russia under-21 international footballers
Russia international footballers
FC Zenit Saint Petersburg players
Russian Premier League players
PFC CSKA Moscow players
FC Akhmat Grozny players
FC Elista players
FC Salyut Belgorod players